The East Bay Regional Park District (EBRPD) is a special district operating in Alameda County and Contra Costa County, California, within the East Bay area of the San Francisco Bay Area.  It maintains and operates a system of regional parks which is the largest urban regional park district in the United States. The administrative office is located in Oakland.

Some of these parks are wilderness areas; others include a variety of visitor attractions, with opportunities for swimming, boating and camping. The trails are frequently used for non-motorized transportation such as biking, hiking, and horse riding.

History
A destructive grass fire that broke out in Wildcat Canyon blew west into Berkeley on September 27, 1923, and burned down 640 structures, mostly homes. The East Bay Water Company was harshly criticized for its failure to deliver enough water to successfully fight the fire. Much of the problem arose from having a system of small private water companies who obtained water either from their own wells or from runoff, then pumped the water to the water companies' wells, Chabot and Temescal. A state law was passed that enabled citizens of Alameda and Contra Costa Counties to create a special district that could obtain water from the Mokelumne River and pump it directly to customers. The East Bay Municipal District (EBMUD) was formed and approved by the electorate.

The EBRPD was founded in 1934, and acquired its first land two years later, when the East Bay Municipal Utility District sold  of its surplus land. The founders of the district included Robert Sibley, a hiking enthusiast, Hollis Thompson, then Berkeley City Manager, and Charles Lee Tilden, among others. William Penn Mott Jr. served as director of the agency from 1962 to 1967, and oversaw a doubling of the system's acreage from 10,500 to 22,000.

In June 2013, EBRPD purchased a  tract of land formerly known as Roddy Ranch in east Contra Costa County. The tract lies south of Antioch and west of Brentwood. The cost was reported as $14.24 million. Funding will also be provided by California Wildlife Conservation Board and an unidentified private foundation. The acquisition does not include Roddy Ranch Golf Club or about 240 acres of privately owned land inside the project boundary. The East Contra Costa County Habitat Conservancy will install gates, fencing and signs around the tract in the coming year, while the sale is in escrow.  The new area will likely be named Deer Valley Regional Park.

In 2016, Vargas Plateau Regional Park in Fremont was the first park ever to have been shut down as the result of legal action in the more than 80-year history of EBRPD. During 2014, EBRPD cut park hours on a temporary and interim basis to reduce public access to Mission Peak in Fremont, using a media strategy designed by political consultant George Manross.

2020 California Wildfires
The parks in the East Bay Regional Park District was badly affected by the various lightning complex fires plaguing the Bay Area in August 2020. The fires have enveloped the Bay Area in a layer of smoke and forced the closures of many national parks within the Bay Area including all parks in the East Bay Regional Parks District.

Notable parks
The parks administered by the EBRPD vary greatly in size and character. Particularly notable are the string of parks along the Berkeley Hills above and east of both Berkeley and Oakland, including Wildcat Canyon Regional Park, Tilden Regional Park, Robert Sibley Volcanic Regional Preserve, Huckleberry Botanic Regional Preserve, and Redwood Regional Park.

There are also bay shore parks such as the Point Pinole Regional Shoreline north of Richmond, the Coyote Hills Regional Park near Fremont, the Martin Luther King Jr. Regional Shoreline on San Leandro Bay, and the Oyster Bay Regional Shoreline south of the Oakland International Airport.

The district also includes a former farm, a former coal mine, an extinct volcano, and one of the biggest dog-walking parks in the country. Redwood Regional Park contains the largest remaining natural stand of coast redwood in the East Bay.

District parks

Anthony Chabot Regional Park
Antioch/Oakley Regional Shoreline
Ardenwood Historic Farm
Big Break Regional Shoreline
Bishop Ranch Regional Preserve
Black Diamond Mines Regional Preserve
Briones Regional Park
Brooks Island Regional Preserve
Browns Island Regional Shoreline
Brushy Peak Regional Preserve
Carquinez Strait Regional Shoreline
Castle Rock Regional Recreational Area
Claremont Canyon Regional Preserve
Contra Loma Regional Park
Coyote Hills Regional Park
Crockett Hills Regional Park
Crown Memorial State Beach (California state park operated by EBRPD)
Cull Canyon Regional Recreation Area
Del Valle Regional Park
Diablo Foothills Regional Park
Don Castro Regional Recreation Area
Dry Creek Pioneer Regional Park
Dublin Hills Regional Park
Eastshore State Park (California state park operated by EBRPD)
Five Canyons Open Space
Garin Regional Park
Hayward Regional Shoreline
Huckleberry Botanic Regional Preserve
Judge John Sutter Regional Shoreline
Kennedy Grove Regional Recreation Area
Lake Chabot Regional Park
Las Trampas Regional Wilderness
Leona Canyon Regional Open Space Preserve
Little Hills Picnic Ranch
Martin Luther King Jr. Shoreline
Middle Harbor Shoreline Park
Miller/Knox Regional Shoreline
Mission Peak Regional Preserve
Morgan Territory Regional Preserve
Ohlone Wilderness
Oyster Bay Regional Shoreline
Pleasanton Ridge
Point Isabel Regional Shoreline
Point Pinole Regional Shoreline
Quarry Lakes Regional Recreation Area
Radke Martinez Regional Shoreline
Redwood Regional Park
Ridgelands Regional Park (in development)
Robert Sibley Volcanic Regional Preserve
Roberts Regional Recreation Area
Round Valley Regional Preserve
Shadow Cliffs Regional Park
Sobrante Ridge Regional Preserve
Sunol Regional Wilderness
Sycamore Valley Regional Open Space Preserve
Tassajara Creek Regional Park
Temescal Regional Recreational Area
Tilden Regional Park
Vargas Plateau Regional Park (reopened May 15, 2017)
Vasco Caves Regional Preserve
Waterbird Regional Preserve
Wildcat Canyon Regional Park

Notes

Interpark Regional Trails

Interpark Regional Trails connect various Regional Parks. Their routes may take them through other parks, along creeks and channels, or even down streets and sidewalks in urbanized areas. The list below does not include trails that exist inside single parks.

Alameda Creek Regional Trail
Bay Area Ridge Trail
Briones to Las Trampas Regional Trail
Calaveras Ridge Trail
California Riding and Hiking Trail
Contra Costa Canal Regional Trail
Delta de Anza Regional Trail
Iron Horse Regional Trail
Lafayette-Moraga Regional Trail
Las Trampas to Mount Diablo Trail
Marsh Creek Regional Trail
Ohlone Wilderness Trail
Old Moraga Ranch Trail
San Francisco Bay Trail
Tassajara Creek/Ridge Trail
Wildcat Creek Trail

Planned expansions

Vargas Plateau Regional Park
Subsequently, park use was pushed back. As of 2007, the opening was expected by 2010. In 2010, EBRPD directors were expecting it would open soon. In 2011, EBRPD put the start in 2012. As of January 2015, EBRPD pointed to late 2015; while as of May 2015, the district pointed to spring 2016.

A 2012 settlement agreement between EBRPD and the owners of two large nearby ranches required the construction of improvements to park access roads. EBRPD and the city of Fremont agreed in 2013 to undertake them jointly, using $260,000 of funding by EBRPD and performed by the city. The park opened on May 5, 2016.

However, the park was closed by a court-issued preliminary injunction on July 13, 2016. The court found that the park district “did not complete the improvements required by the settlement agreement prior to opening,” which had “very specific road widening requirements.” The order applied to access by motor vehicles, as well as to access by non-motorized users for hiking, bicycling and horse riding, with immediate effect. “The park could remain closed for months or years,” until the improvements are completed.

On May 2, 2017, EBRPD announced that it had settled the lawsuit, and that the park would reopen on May 15, 2017. EBRPD said that it agreed to construct a paved shoulder along Vargas Road, and a vehicle turnaround on the upper part of Morrison Canyon Road. It also announced that the City of Fremont had agreed to contribute part of the necessary funds.

Open space (land banks)
One quarter of the District is designated as “land banks,” with no public access. The conversion of that open space to public use as regional parks has no fixed time line, and may span decades. Some parcels may never be converted.

Doolan Canyon tracts
Funding of $1.24 million was provided by Measure WW. The other sides are bounded by private ranches and farmland. A park spokesman said that the parcel, "... will protect the upper reaches of Doolan Canyon for 'habitat protection, open space preservation, and potential recreational opportunities.'" 

According to Sciacca's article, EBRPD had already purchased  adjacent to the Grove tract with funding from Altamont County (Altamont Landfill Open Space Landfill Fund, the City of Livermore, East Bay Community Foundation and Measure WW The price was $6.4 million.

EBRPD says that the Doolan Canyon area is habitat for the endangered species Alameda whip snake and red-legged frog. It also supports other "special status" species and some rare alkali soil plants.

The parcel will remain in land bank status until a land-use plan is written and approved. Making it into a park will require environmental assessments and community input, which could take many years, according to EBRPD. Meanwhile, EBRPD's holdings are known as Doolan Canyon Regional Preserve

Suncrest Homes/Antioch Holdings LLC property
EBRPD acquired a  hillside in Antioch, between Black Diamond Mines Regional Preserve and Contra Loma Regional Park, and bought near Byron Vernon Pools Regional Preserve for $520,000. The 50-acre hillside, valued at $3.5 million, was donated to EBRPD by Suncrest Homes and Antioch Holdings LLC, a Suncrest land-holding subsidiary. The Byron tract is being purchased through the East Contra Costa County Habitat Conservancy, a joint-powers authority created by the county, Brentwood. Oakley, Pittsburg and Next Era Energy.

Hanson Hills property
The tract was identified only as the Hanson Hills property, which had previously been bought by the Save Mount Diablo conservation group. EBRPD reported that it had paid $730,000 for this property, which it intends to include in the Deer Valley Regional Park. The East Contra Costa County Habitat Conservancy contributed $547,000 to the purchase, and the remainder was supplied from the regional park Measure WW bonds approved by East Bay voters. Deer Valley Regional Park remains in Land Bank status and is closed to the public.

Roddy Ranch parcel
In 2013, EBRPD began acquiring Roddy Ranch a   additional tract in east Contra Costa County. The new acquisition will create a nearly continuous offer zone of undeveloped land in eastern Contra Costa County from Black Diamond Mines Regional Park to Marsh Creek.

Dainty Ranch parcel
In 2013, EBRPD announced plans to acquire  of grazing land southwest of the Roddy Ranch tract for $5 million. It will provide hiking and recreation services, and protect habitat for rare species such as the California red-legged frog. The combined Dainty and Roddy tracts will form the future Deer Valley Regional Park near Antioch and Brentwood.

James Ball Dainty, a rancher and coal miner, acquired Dainty Ranch in 1872.

Mollar Ranch parcel
Antioch Unified School District agreed to sell a 192-acre tract known as Mollar Ranch to EBRPD. The tract adjoins the Black Diamond Mines Regional Preserve on Somerville Road in Antioch, California. EBRPD plans to use the property to create a northern entrance to the preserve. The price agreed upon is $305,000. Funding is expected to come from the California Wildlife Protection Act  and East Bay Regional Parks Measure WW funds.

Wildcat Canyon addition
EBRPD announced on February 17, 2014, that it had acquired  of woodland on the east side of Wildcat Canyon Regional Park, which will be added to the existing park. The property is hilly with a mixture of laurels, oaks and native grasses. Fauna include mountain lions, coyotes, deer and hawks. The property had been owned by a developer who had intended to build 36 houses on it, before the recent collapse of real estate prices.

Eddie's Flat acquisition (Brushy Peak Regional Preserve)
On April 3, 2014, two conservation groups,  Center for Biological Diversity and the Alameda Creek Alliance, announced the acquisition of  a  land parcel known as "Eddie's Flat, adjacent to the western boundary of Brushy Peak Regional Preserve.

Public safety and support organization
The district maintains a police department and a fire department.

A volunteer organization that supports the work of EBRPD, the Regional Parks Foundation raises funds for the improvement of the parks. The EBRPD is a member of the Bay Area Open Space Council.

Lifeguards 
East Bay Lifeguards can work at eleven different facilities.

Staff members

Full-time aquatic employees

Aquatic Manager 
General function

.Oversee 11 open water, lagoons, and pools within Alameda and Contra Costa counties.

The Aquatic Manager reports back to the Chief the East Bay Regional Park District Fire Department.

Program Lieutenant 
General function

To assist in planning, developing, conducting and overseeing a wide range of lifeguard training, including emergency medical services, water safety, and lifeguard operations. To development and administration of aquatic recreation programs and promotional efforts. The job also entails supervising and evaluating aquatic programs staff.

The Program Lieutenant reports to the North Captain.

Notes

References

External links

East Bay Regional Park District - official site
Regional Parks Foundation
Regional Parks Association
Bay Area Hiker - descriptions of many EBRPD trails

 
Park districts in California
Government agencies established in 1934
Specialist police departments of California
 
 
Organizations based in Oakland, California
1934 establishments in California
Park police departments of the United States